Pawka (Quechua for a plant (Escallonia herrerae), Hispanicized spellings Pauca, Paucca) is a  mountain  in the Andes of Peru. It is located in the Cusco Region, Canas Province, Layo District, and in the Canchis Province, Marangani District. Pawka lies east of Langui Layo Lake.

References

Mountains of Cusco Region
Mountains of Peru